Wołkowicz is a Polish language surname, a Polonized form of the Belarusian surname Volkovich. Notable people with the surname include:

Bronisław Wołkowicz
Bruno Wolkowitch
Eugeniusz Wołkowicz
Gail Wolkowicz
Lucianne Walkowicz
Tomasz Wołkowicz

Polish-language surnames